Rock and roll entered Greece in the middle of the 1960s. Greek rock performers in the field include Pavlos Sidiropoulos, Dimitris Poulikakos.
Greek rock bands well known globally are Aphrodite's Child, Socrates Drank the Conium and The Last Drive.

1960s
Greek rock originated in the early 1960s with the creation of several anglophone pop-rock bands such as The Forminx (which included composer Vangelis), The Charms, The Idols
, The Olympians, Juniors, M.G.C. and many more. 1968 in Paris saw the formation of Aphrodite's Child, (Vangelis, Demis Roussos and Loukas Sideras) one of the most important and successful Greek rock bands: with their album It's Five O'Clock (1969) and 666 (1972) they achieved worldwide fame. Another aspect of Greek rock in the late '60s saw the release of the first albums of Dionysis Savvopoulos, who combined Greek folk-music with rock elements. In the beginning of the '80s there was a small but energetic number of Punk and New Wave bands and in the 90s Hip Hop entered also in the mainstream of Rock in Greece.

1970s

Rock music in Greece first peaked in the early seventies, while Greece was still ruled by a military dictatorship. Bands included Socrates Drank The Conium (anglophone progressive rock), Nostradamos, Exadahtylos (political/satirical lyrics), Pelóma Bokioú (Santana-like Latin rock with Greek lyrics), Poll (folk with vocal harmonies, Greek lyrics), Axis (Another Paris based Greek Band).

Kostas Tournas is one of the pioneers of Greek rock. He is a singer and composer of many hits in the 1970s with a long career and a string of hits which continue to this day. His 1972 progressive-psychedelic solo album rock opera Aperanta Horafia (Infinite Fields) is considered a landmark of Greek rock and an act of resistance against the junta which ruled Greece at the time.

Tournas along with Robert Williams and Stavros Logarides, co-founders of the legendary rock group Poll, created a music wave which met with great success and took the music scene of Athens by storm. Their music resonated with the young and created songs which still remain in the history of Greek rock.

The fall of the dictatorship was followed by the cultural dominance of progressive thinking although the government was right-wing. For the right wing conservatives as well as for the communist left (KKE), rock was an "imported" (xenoferto – ξενόφερτο) form of music and they instead promoted music based on local traditions like Theodorakis' compositions or plain old Folk Greek music.

One of the most popular rock artists in the decade was Pavlos Sidiropoulos, who managed to merge Rock music with Greek lyrics especially in his collaboration with the band Spiridoula and the album Flou (1978). Another important musician who experimented with Greek lyrics was Nikolas Asimos, who recorded his first illegal tapes during the decade. Greek rock was revived at the end of the seventies, with the first punk and new wave bands, as well as some older artists. The ex-frontman of Exadahtylos, Dimitris Poulikakos made an LP in 1976.

1980s

At the beginning of the 1980s, there was a musical enrichment in the scene as more and more bands flourish, despite the extensive censorship on forms of art that in the later years gradually stopped. One example of this era is that of Mousikes Taxiarhies – Μουσικές Ταξιαρχίες (Greek for Musical Brigades) with frontman Tzimis Panousis. The lyrical content of the band for the time was considered to vary from humorous and lightly satirical to all-out criticizing towards the political life of Greece—nevertheless the band played music with rich musical content; a mixture of many influences besides rock such as reggae and funk. Pavlos Sidiropoulos went on through the decade by forming the band "Aprosarmostoi" and produced some of his best albums with them.
In early 1981 a new band Fatme was formed who combined very creatively elements from Greek popular music roots and rock for the very first time. Their frontman was Nikos Portokaloglou who is still a recording singer-songwriter of great acclaim.

Even though Vasilis Papakonstantinou started his career in the 1970s, it wasn't until the beginning of the 1980s that he gain huge popularity and became one of the most successful Greek rock singers. Vasilis Papakonstantinou is still active and he continues to release successful albums.

In 1980 Syndromo was formed with guitar player Nikos Ginis and Panos Katsikiotis (Chiko) on drums, Bill Korovesis on guitar and Kostas Theodorakos on bass, also a Costas on percussions.
Their first album Συνδρομο-Ριζες was a mix of rock with funk, sounding a lot like Talking Heads which were an inspiration for the band.
Nikos Ginis appeared on the Greek Rock scene in a concert in Zografou's Vaska private school (where at the time most rock concerts were organised), as a surprise one-off guitar solo player with a brilliant local band (The Fakiola brothers band with Nik Kourtis as drummer) and since he had just returned from the US had a lot new tricks up his guitar playing sleeve.
Nikos Ginis and Syndromo in most their songs had hints about heroin (all members were at the time heroin users), and it was one of the few bands who performed their own material.

Another group that deserves mentioning is the PUMSVC (Pneumonoultramicroscopicsilicovolcanoconiasis, or Pneumonokoniasis for short) a progressive rock band from Zografou formed by keyboard player Jim Kavakopoulos and guitarist George Alahouzos (Greek Australian). The band was famous in the area as it was one of the 3–4 who could actually perform live well. George Alahouzos later went on to form another group but his main interest was special effects for cinema, in which he became one of the best in Greece.

Another band from Zografou circa 1979 was the Dalton brothers who later united with PUMSVC.

George Hatzakos and Giannis Jizman deserve also mention as they were two of the first country/folk/rock musicians who performed solo, opening every concert at that time in Zografou.
The "Erogenous zones" was formed in 1979 by George Kalyviotis, George Soilis, Stratos Hatzinikolaou and performed in 2 concerts before breaking up.

With the second generation, the scene produced also some of the finest electric guitar players such as Christophoros Krokidis and Spyros Pazios who to date are still active in various projects. During the mid-1980s, a band called The Last Drive appeared, whose outstanding performance both in Greece and internationally deeply influenced the scene. In 1985 it was the great birth of the modern Greek rock as it is known today and this thanks to a bands from Thessaloniki: Trypes with their first album and two years later in 1987 a trio-band called Mora Sti Fotia – Μωρά στη Φωτιά (Babies on Fire), [veria] whose name was inspired by the song's title "Baby's on Fire" by Brian Eno. The band plays a combination of new wave, punk, soft and hard rock.
One of the legendary bands of that era was En Plo (Εν Πλώ – loosely translated as "En route via a ship"). En Plo, got together in Athens in 1985 by Ntinos Sadkis, Christos Politis and Dimos Zamanos.  After various band member changes and demo tapes, in 1989 they released their self-titled debut album. "En Plo" was produced by Andreas Christofilis, remixed in London and released by the Athenian label Penguin Records in 1001 copies.  Their sound was combining elements of traditional folk music and loud distorted guitars with dark lyrics. The sleeve was impressive as well, with the inner part containing credits and lyrics handwritten by Andreas Christofilis, and the outer sleeve was made out of butchers meat wrapping and attached was a small card resembling the aesthetics of 4AD. This album is considered by many as one of the top ten most rare records of Greek rock music.

However many would argue that the most important rock band from the 80s in Greece would be Lefki Symphonia. The band was created in 1984 in Athens. The members were Thodoris Dimitriou (voice) Takis Barmpagalas (ex "Forwand Music Quintet") (guitar), Diogenes Chatzistefanidis (bass) and Spyros Harisis (drums). In October 1985 they signed a contract with "Triple Action Studios III" to record six tracks and the next year they released their first lp titled "Secret Gardens" from "EMI". In 1986 Michalis Vassiliou was added to their composition (ex "-273 °C", "Alternative Solution 3") on keyboards, who played for two years in the group. In 1987 they traveled together with "Winter Watercolors" to Barcelona where they participated in the "Biennale" exhibition. In the same year a collection was releashed of the Spanish "Ips & Co.", with all the bands that participated in the exhibition, titled "Biennal '87" and contained their track "Rain Is Falling Hard". In 1988 they released the album "Echo of desire" with ten songs, from "EMI".  The song "Looking Back" was the band's first video clip, which aired on "MTV" and was the first Greek video clip played on the channel. After many changes in the bands composition and members the band finally broke up in 1997

En Plo never performed live but once, supporting Green on Red in Rodon Club. A little later, the band recorded a new song, "421", and remixed four tracks from their debut album, to release in 1991 a new EP, something that was never realized. It is rumored that scarce white label copies exist but no one has actually seen them. After one more release (a 7'single) for a fanzine, En Plo decided to split. In 2011, Alltogethernow Records rereleased their debut album.

Other subgenres of rock emerged during this period: heavy metal, punk rock and indie rock gained popularity. Greek metal bands such as Spitfire (Traditional Heavy metal) and black metal sound pioneers Rotting Christ and Varathron, emerged in the 1980s.

1990s
The 1990s is when Greek rock culture was at its highest. It was dominated by the groups Xylina Spathia, Trypes and Stereo Nova. For the first time in Greek rock history, there were sold out appearances in large venues of Greek bands. Thousands of fans cheered these groups; Greece was a great place, musically, to live in during this period. Other groups followed including Diafana Krina, Endelekheia, The Flowers Of Romance, Nama, Pyx Lax, Katsimihas Brothers, Giorgos Dimitriadis kai Oi Mikroi Iroes, Giorgos Dimitriadis then as a solo artist, thirty ντέρτι, Manolis Famellos kai Oi Podilates, Ypogeia Revmata,
Trypes broke up in early 2000s just as Xylina Spathia.

Heavy metal bands continued to emerge in the 1990s, with symphonic death metal band Septic Flesh being one of the most important.

2000s
The 2000s saw less interest in Greek rock music; however, mainstream rock artists of the past decades remained popular.

An anglophone revival during this decade took place, with bands like Raining Pleasure achieving worldwide fame. Furthermore, ex-Trypes frontman Giannis Aggelakas, released several albums with his personal band Oi Episkeptes, combining Greek rock not only with folk elements, but also with Jazz and Reggae.

Firewind took the leading position in modern Heavy metal, releasing four albums in the decade and achieving international popularity. The guitarist of the band, Gus G performed along with Ozzy Osbourne replacing his former guitarist, while the keyboardist Bob Katsionis released personal albums. Septic Flesh reunited and recorded Communion, which received highly positive reviews and recognition as did the album "Cheap Pop for the Elite" from the Corfu-based Rock/Pop Band Kore. Ydro. who became favorites in the underground Rock/Pop scene. During the 2000s a small scene of metal bands playing metalcore/hardcore punk/screamo/deathcore emerged.

2010s
In the 2010s there was a big explosion in the Greek underground scene with the heavy rock music. Dozens of bands started playing heavy, stoner, southern, grunge rock etc., with leading pioneers Planet of Zeus and 1000mods continuing the legacy of Nightstalker and touring relentlessly around Europe.
In 2010 the Greek girl-fronted New Wave-Punk band Barb Wire Dolls became the first band from Greece to re-locate to Los Angeles after receiving continuous airplay on Los Angeles's "World Famous" KROQ radio station by Rodney Bingenheimer on his "Rodney on the Roq" show for their song "California" from their self-released EP "Punk The Fussies!".

See also
Greek punk

References

Greek music
Greece